Paul Douglas Coffey (born June 1, 1961) is a Canadian former professional ice hockey defenceman who played for nine teams over 21 seasons in the National Hockey League (NHL). Known for his speed and scoring prowess, Coffey ranks second all-time among NHL defencemen in goals, assists, and points, behind only Ray Bourque. He won the James Norris Memorial Trophy as the NHL's best defenceman three times and was voted to eight end-of-season All-Star teams (four first-team and four second-team).  He holds the record for the most goals by a defenceman in one season, 48 in 1985–86, and is the only defenceman to have scored 40 goals more than once, also doing it in 1983–84. He is also one of only two defencemen to score 100 points in a season more than one time, as he did it five times; Bobby Orr did it six times. Coffey holds or shares 33 NHL records in the regular season and playoffs.

During his NHL career, he played for the Edmonton Oilers, Pittsburgh Penguins, Los Angeles Kings, Detroit Red Wings, Hartford Whalers, Philadelphia Flyers, Carolina Hurricanes, Chicago Blackhawks, and Boston Bruins. He is a four-time Stanley Cup champion, winning three times with Edmonton and a fourth with Pittsburgh.

Coffey was born in Weston, Ontario, and grew up in Malton, Ontario. The city of Mississauga renamed Malton Arena to Paul Coffey Arena and Wildwood Park to Paul Coffey Park in a ceremony on September 23, 2016. In 2017, Coffey was named one of the 100 Greatest NHL Players in history.

Playing career
In his youth, Coffey played in the 1974 Quebec International Pee-Wee Hockey Tournament with a minor ice hockey team from Mississauga.

Coffey was drafted sixth overall by the Edmonton Oilers in the 1980 NHL Entry Draft. He blossomed in the 1981–82 season, scoring 89 points and was named a second-team NHL All-Star. In the Oilers' first Stanley Cup-winning season, 1983–84, he became only the second defenceman in NHL history to score 40 goals in a season and added 86 assists to finish second in point scoring. He won his first James Norris Memorial Trophy in 1984–85 while posting 37 goals and 121 points. On December 26, 1984, in a game against the Calgary Flames, Coffey became the last defenceman in the 20th century to score four goals in one game. Coffey went on to post a historic post-season in the 1985 Playoffs, setting records for most goals (12), assists (25), and points (37) in one playoff year by a defenceman on the way to another Stanley Cup. He won the Norris Trophy again in 1985–86, while breaking Bobby Orr's record for goals in a season by a defenceman, scoring 48. His 138 points that year was second only to Orr (139 in 1970–71) among defencemen.

Coffey helped Edmonton to a third Cup in 1986–87, but the deciding game seven that year against the Philadelphia Flyers would be his last in an Oilers' uniform. After a monetary dispute with Edmonton's head coach and general manager Glen Sather, Coffey was traded to the Pittsburgh Penguins in 1987. Upon joining Pittsburgh, he changed his uniform number from 7 to 77, which he would wear for most of the rest of his career until his final season in Boston, where he wore 74.

Coffey played four and a half seasons with Pittsburgh. On December 22, 1990, Coffey became the second defenceman to record 1,000 points, doing so in a record-breaking 770 games. Coffey won a fourth Stanley Cup in 1990–91 with Pittsburgh. During the 1992 season Coffey passed Denis Potvin to become the career leader in goals, assists, and points by a defenceman. He was then traded to the Los Angeles Kings where he was reunited with former Oilers teammates Wayne Gretzky and Jari Kurri for parts of two seasons.

After his brief stint with Los Angeles, he was traded to the Detroit Red Wings where he played for three and a half seasons. In the lock-out shortened 1994–95 NHL season, Coffey led his team in scoring for the only time in his entire career, and was awarded the Norris Trophy for the third time. In the 1995 playoffs, he led all defencemen in shorthanded goals (2) while helping Detroit to the Stanley Cup Final. However, the favoured Red Wings were swept by the New Jersey Devils in four games. Coffey would then help the Red Wings to an astounding 62 regular season wins the following year, though the team would ultimately get eliminated by the Colorado Avalanche in the Western Conference Finals. During Game 1 of that series, Coffey accidentally scored on his own net after Colorado's Stephane Yelle attempted to pass the puck into the slot but it instead ended up on Coffey's stick.

After a falling out with Red Wings coach Scotty Bowman, Coffey was traded to the Hartford Whalers at the start of the 1996–97 season as part of a package to acquire Brendan Shanahan – a move that Coffey was unhappy with.

Coffey only played 20 games for the Whalers before being traded to the Flyers. He played for Philadelphia for a season and a half, reaching the 1997 Stanley Cup Final, his seventh, against his former team, Detroit. Coffey's Final series was not successful, being on ice for six of Detroit's goals and was in the penalty box for a seventh when the Flyers conceded a power-play goal, ending up with no points and being minus-2 and minus-3 in the first two games, and a hit from Darren McCarty in game two left Coffey sidelined for the rest of the series with a concussion.

After a very brief stint (10 games) with the Chicago Blackhawks, he was traded to the Carolina Hurricanes, where he played one and a half seasons. He played his final season in 2000–01 with the Boston Bruins.

During Coffey's last NHL season, Ray Bourque passed his career goal, assist and point records, and Bourque and Coffey both retired after the 2000–01 season. Coffey finished with 396 goals, 1135 assists, and 1531 points, and remains second only to Bourque in all-time career scoring by a defenceman. Coffey, however, averaged more points per game than did Bourque, having played 203 fewer games but lagging by only 48 points.

Paul Coffey was voted into the Hockey Hall of Fame in 2004, his first year of eligibility, and the Edmonton Oilers retired his uniform number 7 in 2005.

Post-playing career
While coaching a game for the Toronto Marlboros midget ‘AAA’ team in February 2014, Coffey was assessed a gross misconduct penalty for a "discriminatory slur". The Greater Toronto Hockey League investigated the misconduct penalty and Coffey was handed a three-game suspension. Coffey is a co-owner of the OJHL's Pickering Panthers.

Awards
 Named to the OHA second All-Star team — 1980
 Won the James Norris Memorial Trophy — 1985, 1986, 1995
 Named to the NHL first All-Star team — 1985, 1986, 1989, 1995
 Named to the NHL second All-Star team — 1982, 1983, 1984, 1990
 Played in the NHL All-Star Game — 1982, 1983, 1984, 1985, 1986, 1988, 1989, 1990, 1991, 1992, 1993, 1994, 1996, 1997
4-time Stanley Cup champion — 1984, 1985, 1987 (with Edmonton), 1991 (with Pittsburgh)
Won Canada Cup — 1984, 1987, 1991 (with Team Canada)
 Named to the Canada Cup All-Star team — 1984
 Inducted into the Hockey Hall of Fame in 2004
 In 1998, he was ranked number 28 on The Hockey News list of the 100 Greatest Hockey Players
 Currently 13th all-time in career points (was 9th when he retired in 2000, but was passed by Mario Lemieux later in the 2000–01 season, Joe Sakic on January 1, 2007, Jaromir Jagr on October 12, 2007, and Mark Recchi on March 29, 2011)
Was inducted into the Penguins Hall of Fame on November 15, 2007

He is one of the 2016 inductees into Legends Row: Mississauga Walk of Fame.

NHL records
 Most goals by a defenceman regular season and playoffs combined — 455

Regular season
 Most goals in one season by a defenceman — 48 in 1985–86
 Most shorthanded goals in one season by a defenceman — 9 in 1985–86
 Most assists in one game by a defenceman: (6) on March 14, 1986
 Most points in one game by a defenceman: (8) on March 14, 1986 (2G, 6A, shared with Tom Bladon 4G, 4A)
 Most seasons leading the league in scoring by a defenceman (8)
 Fastest defenceman in NHL history to score 1000 points: (770 Games)
 Longest point-scoring streak by a defenceman: (28 Games) in 1985-86, (Point Totals during streak "16-39-55")
 Most 40-goal seasons by a defenceman career: (2)
 Most 50-assist seasons by a defenceman career: (14)
 Most 60-assist seasons by a defenceman career: (11)
 Most 70-assist seasons by a defenceman career: (6) (Shares record with Bobby Orr)
 Most 80-point seasons by a defenceman career: (8)
 Highest goals per game average by a defenceman in one season: (0.608)
 Highest career assist per game average by a defenceman: (0.806) - "Minimum 750 Games"
 Highest career points per game average by a defenceman: (1.087) - "Minimum 750 Games"
 Only defenceman in NHL history to be selected first-team All-Star playing for three different teams
 Most PIM by a 1000-Point defenceman
 Most different teams played on by a 1000-point scorer - 9 (tied with Jaromir Jagr)

Playoffs
 Most career goals by a defenceman in NHL playoff history: (59)
 Most career points by a defenceman in NHL playoff history: (196)
 Most goals by a defenceman, one playoff year — (12) in 1985
 Most assists by a defenceman, one playoff year — (25) in 1985
 Most points by a defenceman, one playoff year — (37) in 1985
 Most points by a defenceman, one playoff series: (11) in 1985  
 Most assists by a defenceman, five game series: (8) in 1985
 Most assists in one period: (3) in 1985
 Most career short-handed goals by a defenceman in NHL playoff history: (6)
 Most short-handed goals by a defenceman, one playoff year (2) in (1983) and (1996)
 Highest Plus/Minus by a defenceman, one playoff year: +26 in 1985
 Highest goals per game average in one playoff year by a defenceman: (0.667) in 1985 - "Minimum 10 Playoff Games"
 Highest assists per game average in one playoff year by a defenceman: (1.389) in 1985 - "Minimum 5 Playoff Games"
 Highest points per game average in one playoff year by a defenceman: (2.056) in 1985
 Highest career goals per game average in playoffs by a defenceman: (0.304) - "Minimum 75 Games"
 Highest career assists per game average in playoffs by a defenceman: (0.706) - "Minimum 100 Games"
 Highest career points per game average in playoffs by a defenceman: (1.010) - "Minimum 100 Games"

Career statistics
Regular season and playoffs
Figures in boldface italics''''' are NHL records for defencemen.

International

Transactions
November 24, 1987: Traded to Pittsburgh by Edmonton with Dave Hunter and Wayne Van Dorp for Craig Simpson, Dave Hannan, Moe Mantha and Chris Joseph
February 19, 1992: Traded to Los Angeles by Pittsburgh for Brian Benning, Jeff Chychrun and Los Angeles' 1st round choice (later traded to Philadelphia - Philadelphia selected Jason Bowen) in 1992 Entry Draft
January 29, 1993: Traded to Detroit by Los Angeles with Sylvain Couturier and Jim Hiller for Jimmy Carson, Marc Potvin and Gary Shuchuk
October 9, 1996: Traded to Hartford by Detroit with Keith Primeau and Detroit's 1st round choice (Nikos Tselios) in 1997 Entry Draft for Brendan Shanahan and Brian Glynn
December 15, 1996: Traded to Philadelphia by Hartford with Hartford's 3rd round choice (Kris Mallette) in 1997 Entry Draft for Kevin Haller, Philadelphia's 1st round choice (later traded to San Jose - San Jose selected Scott Hannan) in 1997 Entry Draft and Hartford's 7th round choice (previously acquired, Carolina selected Andrew Merrick) in 1997 Entry Draft
June 27, 1998: Traded to Chicago by Philadelphia for NY Islanders' 5th round choice (previously acquired, Philadelphia selected Francis Belanger) in 1998 Entry Draft
December 29, 1998: Traded to Carolina by Chicago for Nelson Emerson
July 13, 2000: Signed as a free agent by Boston

Personal life
Coffey is the owner of a car dealership in Bolton, Ontario. Coffey and his wife have three children.

See also
Hockey Hall of Fame
James Norris Memorial Trophy
List of NHL statistical leaders
List of NHL players with 1000 points
List of NHL players with 1000 games played

References

External links

 
 
 Hockey-Fans profile

1961 births
Arizona Coyotes coaches
Boston Bruins players
Canadian ice hockey coaches
Canadian ice hockey defencemen
Carolina Hurricanes players
Chicago Blackhawks players
Detroit Red Wings players
Edmonton Oilers coaches
Edmonton Oilers draft picks
Edmonton Oilers players
Hartford Whalers players
Hockey Hall of Fame inductees
Ice hockey people from Toronto
James Norris Memorial Trophy winners
Kingston Canadians players
Kitchener Rangers players
Living people
Los Angeles Kings players
National Hockey League All-Stars
National Hockey League first-round draft picks
National Hockey League players with retired numbers
People from Weston, Toronto
Philadelphia Flyers players
Pittsburgh Penguins players
Sault Ste. Marie Greyhounds players
Stanley Cup champions